= Cobalt lactate =

Names
- Other names Co(II) lactate, cobalt;2-hydroxypropanoic acid, cobalt dilactate

Identifiers
CAS Number	16039-54-6
3D model (JSmol)	Interactive image
ChemSpider	141578
PubChem CID	91886522
CompTox Dashboard (EPA)	DTXSID70936286
- InChI: InChI=1S/2C3H6O3.Co/c2*1-2(4)3(5)6;/h2*2,4H,1H3,(H,5,6); Key: VLHKOTBFHYKKQJ-UHFFFAOYSA-N
- SMILES: CC(C(=O)O)O.CC(C(=O)O)O.[Co]

Properties
Chemical formula	Co(C_{3}H_{5}O_{3})_{2}
Molar mass	239.09
Appearance	Peach-blossom pink salt
Solubility in water	Soluble
- Except where otherwise noted, data are given for materials in their standard state (at 25 °C [77 °F], 100 kPa). Infobox references

Cobalt lactate is a chemical compound, a salt of cobalt and lactic acid with the formula Co(C_{3}H_{5}O_{3})_{2}.

== Properties ==
Cobalt lactate forms a peach-blossom red salt. It is soluble in water.

When heated, the compound becomes black, takes fire, and leaves cobalt oxide.

== Synthesis ==
Cobalt lactate can be formed by boiling hydrated oxide of cobalt with lactic acid.

== Use ==
Cobalt lactate is used as a ruminal source of cobalt in a high-forage total mixed ration fed to late-lactation dairy cows.
